John Cecil may refer to:

 John Cecil (priest) (1558–1626)

John Cecil, 4th Earl of Exeter (1628–1678)
John Cecil, 5th Earl of Exeter (c. 1648–1700)
John Cecil, 6th Earl of Exeter (1674–1721)
John Cecil, 7th Earl of Exeter (c. 1700–1722)

See also